Austin Nichols & Co Inc v Stichting Lodestar [2007] NZSC 103 is a decision of the Supreme Court of New Zealand handed down on 11 December 2007. It is the leading authority on the role of an appellate court in general appeals.

Composition of the Court
Elias CJ, Blanchard, Tipping, McGrath and Anderson JJ. The judgment was unanimous and united. Elias J delivered the Court's reasons.

Decision
This was originally a trade mark dispute, but the importance of the case lies in the impact on civil procedure.  Austin Nichols marketed a brand of bourbon called Wild Turkey, Stichting Lodestar wished to register a whiskey called Wild Geese.

Notes

2007 in New Zealand law
Supreme Court of New Zealand cases
2007 in case law